The Huanggang–Huangmei high-speed railway is a high-speed railway line in Hubei, China.

History
Construction on the line officially began in December 2018. It had been expected to open by the end of 2021. It actually opened on 22 April 2022.

Stations
(Through service to Wuhan via Wuhan–Huanggang intercity railway)
Huanggang East
Xishui South
Qichun South
Wuxue North
Huangmei East

References

High-speed railway lines in China
Railway lines opened in 2022
Rail transport in Hubei